Stable Mable is an album led by saxophonist Dexter Gordon recorded in 1975 and released on the Danish SteepleChase label.

Reception

In his review for AllMusic, Scott Yanow said "Dexter Gordon is in frequently exuberant form on this quartet session ...the veteran tenor sounds quite inspired throughout the joyous outing".

Track listing
 "Just Friends" (John Klenner, Sam M. Lewis) - 7:59
 "Misty" (Johnny Burke, Erroll Garner) - 8:18
 "Red Cross" (Charlie Parker) - 7:51
 "So What" (Miles Davis) - 8:23
 "In a Sentimental Mood" (Duke Ellington, Manny Kurtz, Irving Mills) - 6:54
 "Stablemates" (Benny Golson) - 9:56
 "Just Friends" [Alternate Take] (Klenner, Lewis) - 8:09 Bonus track on CD reissue 		
 "Misty" [Alternate Take] (Burke, Garner) - 7:45 Bonus track on CD reissue  		
 "Red Cross" [Alternate Take] (Parker) - 6:12 Bonus track on CD reissue

Personnel
Dexter Gordon - tenor saxophone, soprano saxophone
Horace Parlan - piano
Niels-Henning Ørsted Pedersen - bass 
Tony Inzalaco - drums

References

1975 albums
Dexter Gordon albums
SteepleChase Records albums